Coeloptera epiloma is a species of moth of the family Tortricidae. It is found in Australia, where it has been recorded from New South Wales, Victoria and Tasmania.

Adults have been recorded on wing from November to January.

References

Archipini
Moths described in 1902
Moths of Australia
Taxa named by Oswald Bertram Lower